Peter Schofield is an Australian former professional rugby league footballer who played in the 1970s and 1980s.

Background
Schofield was raised in the New South Wales town of Young and was recruited to North Sydney via Dapto.

Playing career
A utility back, Schofield played two seasons of first-grade at North Sydney. In 1978 he featured in a variety of positions and was the club's first choice goal-kicker, amassing 127 points for the season. He was a member of the North Sydney side which won the 1978 Challenge Cup, a post season competition. The following season he was replaced as goal-kicker by new recruit Rod Henniker and spent the entire season as a fullback. He was one of North Sydney's captains in 1979.

In the 1980 NSWRFL season he was picked up by Penrith, where he played as a centre and winger in what was his only year at the club.

References

External links
Peter Schofield at Rugby League project

Australian rugby league players
Living people
North Sydney Bears players
Penrith Panthers players
Place of birth missing (living people)
Rugby league centres
Rugby league fullbacks
Rugby league players from New South Wales
Rugby league wingers
Year of birth missing (living people)